The Division of West Sydney was an Australian electoral division in the state of New South Wales. It was located in the inner western suburbs of Sydney, and at various times included the suburbs of Pyrmont, Darling Harbour, Surry Hills, Balmain, Glebe, and from 1955 to 1969, Lord Howe Island.

The division was proclaimed in 1900, and was one of the original 75 divisions to be contested at the first federal election. It was abolished at the redistribution of 21 November 1968. It was the first of four seats to be held by Billy Hughes, the eleventh Prime Minister of Australia and the longest-serving member of the Australian Parliament. It was also held by T. J. Ryan, a former Premier of Queensland.

Members

Election results

References

1901 establishments in Australia
Constituencies established in 1901
West Sydney